Donald Allen Wollheim (October 1, 1914 – November 2, 1990) was an American science fiction editor, publisher, writer, and fan. As an author, he published under his own name as well as under pseudonyms, including David Grinnell, Martin Pearson, and Darrell G. Raynor.

A founding member of the Futurians, he was a leading influence on science fiction development and fandom in the 20th-century United States.

Ursula K. Le Guin called Wollheim "the tough, reliable editor of Ace Books, in the Late Pulpalignean Era, 1966 and '67", which is when he published her first two novels in Ace Double editions.

Science fiction fan

The Encyclopedia of Science Fiction (first edition, 1979) calls Wollheim "one of the first and most vociferous SF fans." He published numerous fanzines and co-edited the early Fanciful Tales of Time and Space.  His importance to early fandom is chronicled in the 1974 book The Immortal Storm by Sam Moskowitz and in the 1977 book The Futurians by Damon Knight.

Wollheim organized what was later deemed the first American science fiction convention, when a group from New York met with a group from Philadelphia on October 22, 1936 in Philadelphia. The modern Philcon convention claims descent from this event. Out of this meeting, plans were formed for regional and national meetings, including the first Worldcon.

Wollheim was a member of the New York Science Fiction League, one of the clubs established by Hugo Gernsback to promote science fiction. When payment was not forthcoming for the first story he sold to Gernsback, Wollheim formed a group with several other authors, and successfully sued for payment. He was expelled from the Science Fiction League as "a disruptive influence" but was later reinstated. From the September 1935 issue of Gernsback's Wonder Stories:

In 1937 Wollheim founded the Fantasy Amateur Press Association, whose first mailing (July 1937) included this statement from him: "There are many fans desiring to put out a voice who dare not, for fear of being obliged to keep it up, and for the worry and time taken by subscriptions and advertising. It is for them and for the fan who admits it is his hobby and not his business that we formed the FAPA." In 1938, with several friends, he formed the Futurians—arguably the best-known of the science fiction clubs. At one time or another, the membership included Isaac Asimov, Frederik Pohl, Cyril Kornbluth, James Blish, John Michel, Judith Merril, Robert A. W. Lowndes, Richard Wilson, Damon Knight, Virginia Kidd, and Larry T. Shaw. In 1943 Wollheim married fellow Futurian Elsie Balter (1910–1996). It proved to be a lasting marriage and publishing partnership.

The Futurians became less fan-oriented and more professional after 1940. Its conferences and workshops focused on writing, editing, and publishing, with many of its members interested in all three.

Author

Wollheim's first story, "The Man from Ariel", was published in the January 1934 issue of Wonder Stories when he was nineteen. 
 
He was not paid for the story, and when he learned that other authors had not been paid either, he said so in the Bulletin of the Terrestrial Fantascience Guild. Publisher Hugo Gernsback eventually settled with Wollheim and the other authors out of court for $75. However, when Wollheim submitted another story ("The Space Lens") under the pseudonym Millard Verne Gordon, he was once again cheated by Gernsback who published it in the September 1935 issue. His third known story was published in Fanciful Tales of Time and Space, Fall 1936, a fanzine that he edited himself. That year he also published and edited another short-lived fanzine, Phantagraph.

Wollheim's stories were published regularly from 1940; at the same time he was becoming an important editor. In the 1950s and 60s he wrote chiefly novels. He usually used pseudonyms for works aimed at grownups, and wrote children's novels under his own name. Notable and popular were the eight "Mike Mars" books for children, which explored different facets of the NASA space program. Also well-received were the "Secret" books for young readers: The Secret of Saturn's Rings (1954), Secret of the Martian Moons (1955), and The Secret of the Ninth Planet (1959). As Martin Pearson he published the "Ajax Calkins" series, which became the basis for his novel Destiny's Orbit (1962). A sequel, Destination: Saturn was published in 1967 in collaboration with Lin Carter. The Universe Makers (1971) is a discussion of themes and philosophy in science fiction.

One of Wollheim's short stories, "Mimic", was made into the film of the same name by director and co-writer Guillermo del Toro, released in 1997.

His daughter Betsy declared: "In true editorial fashion, he was honest about the quality of his own writing. He felt it was fair to middling at best. He always knew that his great talent was as an editor."

Editor and publisher
Robert Silverberg said that Wollheim was "one of the most significant figures in 20th century American science fiction publishing," adding, "A plausible case could be made that he was the most significant figure—responsible in large measure for the development of the science fiction paperback, the science fiction anthology, and the whole post-Tolkien boom in fantasy fiction."

In late 1940, Wollheim noticed a new magazine titled Stirring Detective and Western Stories on the newsstands. He wrote to the publishers, Albing Publications, to see if they were interested in adding a science fiction title to their list, and he was invited to meet them. They  did not have capital, however, and only guaranteed him a salary if the magazines were successful. He approached some of his fellow Futurians for free stories (some published under pseudonyms to protect their reputations with paying editors). It resulted in Wollheim's editing two of the earliest periodicals devoted to science fiction, the Cosmic Stories and Stirring Science Stories magazines starting in February 1941. After the magazines were cancelled later in 1941, Wollheim was able to find another publisher, Manhattan Fiction Publications, and a fourth issue of Stirring appeared, dated March 1942.  Wartime constraints prevented ongoing publication, and there were no more issues of either title.

Wollheim edited the first science fiction anthology to be mass-marketed, The Pocket Book of Science Fiction (1943). It was also the first book containing the words "science fiction" in the title. It included works by Robert A. Heinlein, Theodore Sturgeon, T. S. Stribling, Stephen Vincent Benét, Ambrose Bierce, and H. G. Wells. In 1945 Wollheim edited the first hardcover anthology from a major publisher and the first omnibus, The Viking Portable Novels of Science. He also edited the first anthology of original science fiction, The Girl With the Hungry Eyes (1947), although there is evidence that this last was originally intended to be the first issue of a new magazine.

Between 1947 and 1951 he was editor at the pioneering paperback publisher Avon Books, where he made available highly affordable editions of the works of A. Merritt, H. P. Lovecraft, and C. S. Lewis' Silent Planet space trilogy, bringing these previously little known authors a wide readership. During this period he also edited eighteen issues of the influential Avon Fantasy Reader as well as three of the Avon Science Fiction Reader. These periodicals contained mostly reprints and a few original stories.

In 1952 Wollheim left Avon to work for A. A. Wyn at the Ace Magazine Company and spearheaded a new paperback book list, Ace Books. In 1953 he introduced science fiction to the Ace lineup, and for 20 years as editor-in-chief was responsible for their multi-genre list and, most important to him, their renowned sf list. Wollheim invented the Ace Doubles series which consisted of pairs of books, usually by different authors, bound back-to-back with two "front" covers. Because these paired books had to fit a fixed total page length, one or both were usually abridged to fit, and Wollheim often made other editorial alterations—as witness the differences between Poul Anderson's Ace novel War of the Wing-Men and its definitive revised edition, The Man Who Counts. Among the authors who made their paperback debuts in Ace Doubles were Philip K. Dick, Samuel R. Delany, Leigh Brackett, Ursula K. Le Guin, and John Brunner. William S. Burroughs' first book, Junkie, was published as an Ace Double. Wollheim also helped develop Marion Zimmer Bradley, Robert Silverberg, Avram Davidson, Fritz Leiber, Andre Norton, Thomas Burnett Swann, Jack Vance, and Roger Zelazny, among others. While at Ace, he and co-editor Terry Carr began an annual anthology series, The World's Best Science Fiction, the first collection of what they considered the best of the prior year's short stories, from magazines, hardcovers, paperback collections and other anthologies.

In the early 1960s Ace reintroduced Edgar Rice Burroughs' work, which had long been out of print, and in 1965, Ace bought the paperback rights to Dune (Herbert's title worried Wollheim, who feared it would be mistaken for a western). Eventually, Ace introduced single paperback books and became one of the preeminent genre publishers. Ace and Ballantine dominated sf in the 1960s and built the genre by publishing original material as well as reprints.

Tolkien controversy

 
Before the 1960s, no American paperback publisher would publish fantasy. It was believed that there was no public demand for fantasy and that it would not sell. Wollheim published an unauthorized paperback edition of J. R. R. Tolkien's The Lord of the Rings in three volumes, the first mass-market paperback edition of Tolkien's epic, despite not being a fantasy fan. In a 2006 interview his daughter, Betsy Wollheim, said:

Tolkien authorized a paperback edition of The Hobbit in 1961, though that edition was never made available outside the U.K. Eventually, he supported paperback editions of The Lord of the Rings and several of his other texts, but whether he was persuaded to do so by the sales of the Ace editions is unknown. In any case, Ace was forced to cease publishing the unauthorized edition and to pay Tolkien for their sales following a grass-roots campaign by Tolkien's U.S. fans. A 1993 court determined that the copyright loophole suggested by Ace Books was invalid and its paperback edition was found to have been a violation of copyright under U.S. law (at this time, the U.S. had yet to join the International Copyright Convention, and most laws on the books existed to protect domestic creations from foreign infringement. Houghton Mifflin was technically in violation of the law when they exceeded their import limits and failed to renew their interim copyright). In the Locus obituary for Donald Wollheim, however, more details emerge:

DAW Books

Wollheim left Ace in 1971. Frederik Pohl describes the circumstances:
Unfortunately, when Wyn died [in 1968] the company was sold to a consortium headed by a bank. ... Few of them had any publishing experience before they found themselves running Ace. It showed. Before long, bills weren't being paid, authors' advances and royalties were delayed, budgets were cut back, and most of Donald's time was spent trying to soothe authors and agents who were indignant, and had every right to be, at the way they were treated.

Upon leaving Ace, he and his wife, Elsie Balter Wollheim, founded DAW Books, named for his initials. DAW can claim to be the first mass market specialist science fiction and fantasy fiction publishing house. DAW issued its first four titles in April 1972. Most of the writers whom he had developed at Ace went with him to DAW: Marion Zimmer Bradley, Andre Norton, Philip K. Dick, John Brunner, A. Bertram Chandler, Kenneth Bulmer, Gordon R. Dickson, A. E. van Vogt, and Jack Vance. In later years, when his distributor, New American Library, threatened to withhold Thomas Burnett Swann's Biblical fantasy How Are the Mighty Fallen (1974) because of its homosexual content, Wollheim fought vigorously against their decision and they relented.

His later author discoveries included Tanith Lee, Jennifer Roberson, Michael Shea, Tad Williams, Celia S. Friedman, and C. J. Cherryh, whose Downbelow Station (1982) was the first DAW book to win the Hugo Award for best novel. He was also able to give a number of British writers—including E. C. Tubb, Brian Stableford, Barrington Bayley, and Michael Coney—a new American audience. He published translations of international sf as well as anthologies of translated stories, Best From the Rest of the World. With the help of Arthur W. Saha, Wollheim also edited and published the popular "Annual World's Best Science Fiction" anthology from 1971 until his death.

Recognition
Algis Budrys in 1966 gave Wollheim a Galaxy Bookshelf award "for doing his job". Upon Wollheim's death in 1990, the prolific editor Robert Silverberg argued (above) that he may have been "the most significant figure" in American SF publishing.

Robert Jordan credits Wollheim for helping to launch Jordan's career. Wollheim made an offer for Jordan's first novel, Warriors of the Ataii, though he withdrew the offer when Jordan requested some minor changes to the contract. Jordan claims that Wollheim's first, 'laudatory' letter convinced him that he could write, and so he chose to remember the first letter and forget about the second. The novel was never published, but Jordan went on to write the immensely successful Wheel of Time series for a different publisher.

Marion Zimmer Bradley referred to him as "a second father", Frederik Pohl called him "a founder", and Robert Silverberg says he was "seriously underrated" and "one of the great shapers of science-fiction publishing in the United States". In 1977 scholar Robert Scholes named Wollheim "one of the most important editors and publishers of science fiction."

From 1975 on, Wollheim received several special awards for his contributions to science fiction and to fantasy, including one at the 1975 World SF Convention and runner-up to Ian & Betty Ballantine at the 1975 World Fantasy Convention.

The Science Fiction and Fantasy Hall of Fame inducted him in 2002, its seventh class of two deceased and two living persons. He is the third person inducted primarily for his work as editor or publisher, after the inaugural 1996 pair Hugo Gernsback and John W. Campbell.

Selected works

As editor:

World's Best Science Fiction, 1965–1971 (with Terry Carr)
World's Best Science Fiction: 1965 (also known as World's Best Science Fiction: First Series, 1965)
World's Best Science Fiction: 1966 (also known as World's Best Science Fiction: Second Series, 1966
World's Best Science Fiction: 1967 (also known as World's Best Science Fiction: Third Series, 1967)
World's Best Science Fiction: 1968 (also known as World's Best Science Fiction: Fourth Series, 1968)
World's Best Science Fiction: 1969 (1969)
World's Best Science Fiction: 1970 (1970)
World's Best Science Fiction: 1971 (1971)

The Annual World's Best SF, 1972–1990 (with Arthur W. Saha)
The 1972 Annual World's Best SF (also known as Wollheim's World's Best SF: Series One, 1972)
The 1973 Annual World's Best SF (also known as Wollheim's World's Best SF: Series Two, 1973)
The 1974 Annual World's Best SF (also known as Wollheim's World's Best SF: Series Three, 1974)
The 1975 Annual World's Best SF (also known as Wollheim's World's Best SF: Series Four, 1975)
The 1976 Annual World's Best SF (also known as Wollheim's World's Best SF: Series Five, 1976)
The 1977 Annual World's Best SF (also known as Wollheim's World's Best SF: Series Six, 1977)
The 1978 Annual World's Best SF (also known as Wollheim's World's Best SF: Series Seven, 1978)
The 1979 Annual World's Best SF (also known as Wollheim's World's Best SF: Series Eight, 1979)
The 1980 Annual World's Best SF (also known as Wollheim's World's Best SF: Series Nine, 1980)
The 1981 Annual World's Best SF (1981)
The 1982 Annual World's Best SF (1982)
The 1983 Annual World's Best SF (1983)
The 1984 Annual World's Best SF (1984)
The 1985 Annual World's Best SF (1985)
The 1986 Annual World's Best SF (1986)
The 1987 Annual World's Best SF (1987)
The 1988 Annual World's Best SF (1988)
The 1989 Annual World's Best SF (1989)
The 1990 Annual World's Best SF (1990)

As writer:

Novels
Across Time (as David Grinnell)
Destination: Saturn (as David Grinnell, with Lin Carter)
Destiny's Orbit (as David Grinnell; published as an Ace Double with John Brunner's Times Without Number)
The Edge of Time (as David Grinnell)
The Martian Missile (as David Grinnell)
One Against the Moon
The Secret of the Martian Moons (1955, Winston Science Fiction series)
The Secret of the Ninth Planet (1959, Winston Science Fiction series)
The Secret of Saturn's Rings (1954, Winston Science Fiction series)
To Venus! To Venus! (as David Grinnell)

Mike Mars series
Source:

Mike Mars, Astronaut (1961)
Mike Mars Flies the X-15 (1961)
Mike Mars at Cape Canaveral (renamed Mike Mars at Cape Kennedy when published in paperback in 1966) (1961)
Mike Mars in Orbit (1961)
Mike Mars Flies the Dyna-Soar (1962)
Mike Mars, South Pole Spaceman (1962)
Mike Mars and the Mystery Satellite (1963)
Mike Mars Around the Moon (1964)

Writing about science fiction
The Universe Makers: Science Fiction Today (1971): a "survey and behind-the-scenes look at" science fiction "from the advent of the Golden Age"

See also
 Ace Double
 Winston Science Fiction

References

External links

 DAW Books, founded by and named for Wollheim
 
 
 
 
 
 Bibliography at fantasticfiction.co.uk
 Bibliography at geometry.net
 Anthopology 101: Pocketbooks and Portable Libraries by Bud Webster at Galactic Central
 Anthopology 101: The Real Macabre by Bud Webster at Galactic Central
 Audio recording of Donald Wollheim participating in panel discussion at the First World Fantasy Convention at the Internet Archive
 Donald A. Wollheim Papers at the Kenneth Spencer Research Library at the University of Kansas
 Donald A. Wollheim on H. Rider Haggard and She (full text)

1914 births
1990 deaths
American science fiction writers
American book editors
American paperback book publishers (people)
Science fiction editors
Futurians
Science Fiction Hall of Fame inductees
Writers from New York City
20th-century American novelists
American male novelists
20th-century American businesspeople
20th-century American male writers
Novelists from New York (state)